"Humongous" is a song by English singer, songwriter, and musician Declan McKenna. It was released as the sixth single from McKenna's debut studio album, What Do You Think About the Car? on 9 June 2017 through Columbia Records. The song was written by Declan McKenna and produced by James Ford.

Background
Talking about the song, McKenna said, "I love big powerful choruses that you can just scream, and I wanted this to be one of those. I remember writing it just sat home alone with my sister’s guitar in complete euphoria with only a chorus written and nothing else, just shouting the words which are super vague but just summed up all the confusion and frustration I’ve had the last two years."

Live performances
On 11 April 2017, McKenna performed the song live on live on the late-night talk show Conan, which was shown on TBS.

Music video
A music video to accompany the release of "Humongous" was first released onto YouTube on 9 June 2017.

Personnel
Credits adapted from Tidal.
 James Ford – producer, drums
 Declan McKenna – composer, lyricist, associated performer, vocal
 Max Prior – assistant engineer
 Jimmy Robertson – engineer
 Barry Grint – mastering engineer
 Craig Silvey – mixing engineer

Charts

Release history

References

2017 songs
2017 singles
Declan McKenna songs